The main article describes all European Soling Championships from one the first held in 1968 to the announced Championships in the near future. This article states the detailed results, where relevant the controversies, and the progression of the Championship during the series race by race of the European Soling Championships in the years 1990, 1991, 1992, 1993 and 1994. This is based on the major sources: World Sailing, the world governing body for the sport of sailing recognized by the IOC and the IPC, and the publications of the International Soling Association. Unfortunately not all crew names are documented in the major sources.

1990 Final results 

 1990 Progress

1991 Final results 

 1991 Progress

1992 Final results 

 1992 Progress

1993 Final results 

 1993 Progress

1994 Final results 

 1994 Progress

Further results
For further results see:
 Soling European Championship results (1968–1979)
 Soling European Championship results (1980–1984)
 Soling European Championship results (1985–1989)
 Soling European Championship results (1990–1994)
 Soling European Championship results (1995–1999)
 Soling European Championship results (2000–2004)
 Soling European Championship results (2005–2009)
 Soling European Championship results (2010–2014)
 Soling European Championship results (2015–2019)
 Soling European Championship results (2020–2024)

References

Soling European Championships